"Fade" was an extremely obscure single released promotionally in the Philippines by the band Blue Angel, taken from their 1980 album also called Blue Angel. Vocals were provided by Cyndi Lauper. It did not achieve any chart success and did not even have an accompanying picture sleeve. It was a last-ditch effort to capitalize on the record which had not lived up to sales expectations.

Track listing
Length: 5 min 20 sec

Personnel
Lyrics: Cyndi Lauper and John Turi. Production: Roy Halee. 
Lyrics: Blue Angel and Henry Gross. Production: Roy Halee.

External links
 Single's entry at official Discography
 Historical entry on official website
 Official Cyndi Lauper website

1980 singles
Blue Angel (band) songs
Cyndi Lauper songs
Songs written by Cyndi Lauper
Songs written by John Turi
Song recordings produced by Roy Halee
1980 songs
Polydor Records singles